The following is a list of current Major League Soccer broadcasters for each individual team.

International video broadcasters

2023–2032 

Apple Inc. has exclusive global rights to every MLS match, with on-site commentary in English and Spanish on MLS Season Pass. All match broadcasts are produced by MLS Productions, a partnership of Major League Soccer, IMG and NEP Group. MLS generally assigns announcers regionally, reportedly to retain local familiarity among fans but largely suspected to be to save money on production costs. The on-site commentary is guaranteed for at least 2023, with future seasons unknown.

In addition, MLS Productions produces whip-around, pre-match and post-match studio shows from NEP Metropolis Studios in Harlem, Manhattan, New York. There is a pre-match show, MLS Countdown, which airs 30 (Eastern/Central) or 15 (Mountain/Pacific) minutes before games, which in most cases will be 7:30 p.m. local time. The national post-match show, MLS Wrap-Up, airs at 12:30 a.m. Eastern time. The whip-around show is called MLS 360 and will cut into matches of significance.

All matches involving CF Montréal, Toronto FC and Vancouver Whitecaps have French-language commentary with commentators based in Canada.

MLS Productions is expected to produce Portuguese commentary beginning with the 2025 season.

2023 commentator pairings 
English:

Jake Zivin and Taylor Twellman
Keith Costigan and Maurice Edu
Kevin Egan and Kyndra de St. Aubin
Steve Cangialosi and Danny Higginbotham
Eric Krakauer and Lloyd Sam
Jenn Hildreth or Chris Wittyngham and Lori Lindsey
Blake Price and Paul Dolan
Max Bretos and Brian Dunseth
Mark Followill or Chris Wittyngham and Danielle Slaton
Andres Cordero and Jamie Watson
Callum Williams and Calen Carr
Tyler Terens and Devon Kerr
Tony Husband and Ross Smith
Mark Rogondino and Heath Pearce
Ed Cohen and Greg Sutton
Adrian Healey and Cobi Jones
Play-by-play (main) commentator Nate Bukaty, match analysts (co-commentators) Warren Barton and Tony Meola will contribute throughout the season.

Spanish:
Pablo Ramírez and Carlos Ruiz
Jorge Pérez-Navarro and Marcelo Balboa
Juan Guillermo Arango and Carlos Suárez
Sergio Ruiz and Miguel Gallardo
Moisés Linares and Jaime Fernando Macías
Bruno Vain and Andrés Agulla
Jose Hernandez and Pablo Mariño
Ramsés Sandoval and Walter Roque
Rodolfo Landeros and Martín Zuñiga
Raúl Guzmán and Sonny Guadarrama
Adrian Garcia Marquez and Francisco Pinto
Sammy Sadovnik and Eduardo Biscayart
Narrador (play-by-play) Francisco X. Rivera and analista (co-commentator) Maximiliano Cordaro will contribute throughout the season.

French:

Frédéric Lord and Vincent Destouches
Matthew Cullen and Sébastien Le Toux
Olivier Brett and Patrice Bernier
Descripteur (play-by-play) Jeremy Filosa and analyste Matthias Van Halst will contribute throughout the season.

National video broadcasters

2023–2026

Regional radio broadcasters 

Note: MLS Season Pass on Apple TV includes the English-language MLS regional radio broadcast for the home team during the 2023–2032 seasons.

Eastern Conference

Western Conference

See also 
 Major League Soccer on television
 List of current Major League Baseball broadcasters
 List of current National Basketball Association broadcasters
 List of current National Football League broadcasters
 List of current National Hockey League broadcasters
 List of current Women's National Basketball Association broadcasters

References

External links

Major League Soccer on television
Lists of Major League Soccer broadcasters
Major League Soccer
Major League Soccer broadcasters